Maxim Vasilievich Balmochnykh (born March 7, 1979) is a Russian former professional ice hockey winger who played 6 games in the National Hockey League (NHL).

Playing career 
Balmochnykh began his career with his hometown team HC Lipetsk of the Vysshaya Liga before moving to the Russian Superleague's HC Lada Togliatti. He was drafted in the second round, 45th overall, by the Mighty Ducks of Anaheim in the 1997 NHL Entry Draft. After being drafted, Balmochnykh made his North American debut with the Quebec Remparts of the QMJHL in the 1998–99 season.  He then joined the Ducks organization and was assigned to the Cincinnati Mighty Ducks of the American Hockey League.  His call up to the NHL came during the 2000–01 season, during which he played six games for the Mighty Ducks, scoring one assist.  He spent the next two seasons in Cincinnati before he was traded to the New Jersey Devils on July 6, 2002, with Jeff Friesen and Oleg Tverdovsky for Petr Sýkora, Jean-Francois Damphousse, Mike Commodore, and Igor Pohanka.

Balmochnykh returned to Russia in 2002 with Severstal Cherepovets while New Jersey retained his NHL rights.  He returned to the Devils the next season but spent the entire season in the AHL for the Albany River Rats.

Balmochnykh became a free agent in 2004 and returned to Russia permanently, rejoining HK Lipetsk.  After two seasons in the Vysshaya Liga, Lipetsk were relegated to the Pervaya Liga, the country's third tier league and Balmochnykh moved to Belarus with HC Dynamo Minsk before returning to the Russian Superleague with Metallurg Novokuznetsk.  After a disappointing season, he was released and he returned to Dynamo Minsk before signing with HK Gomel in 2008.  He then rejoined Dinamo Minsk, who were now playing in the newly formed Kontinental Hockey League.

Career statistics

Regular season and playoffs

International

References

External links
 

1979 births
Albany River Rats players
Anaheim Ducks draft picks
HK Brest players
Cincinnati Mighty Ducks players
HC Dinamo Minsk players
HK Gomel players
HC Lada Togliatti players
Metallurg Novokuznetsk players
Severstal Cherepovets players
Living people
Mighty Ducks of Anaheim players
Sportspeople from Lipetsk
Quebec Remparts players
Russian expatriates in the United States
Russian ice hockey left wingers